Paul Fischli (born 6 May 1945 in Glarus) is a Swiss former football player and manager. He played as a defender throughout the 1960s, 1970s and early 1980s.

Career
As a sixteen-year-old, Paul Fischli played his debut in the FC Glarus first team in the third amateur division. The team were promoted to the 2. Liga at the end of the season. Fischli started playing semi-professionally in 1965 with FC Young Fellows Zürich in the Nationalliga B (later renamed Challenge League). Young Fellows were promoted at the end of the season to the Nationalliga A (later renamed Swiss Super League). Fischli played for Young Fellows for three years, but the team was relegated at the end of the 1967–68 season and the club sold the entire team.

Fischli signed for FC Basel in August 1968. He became an integral part of the Basel team alongside the likes of René Hasler, Ottmar Hitzfeld and Karl Odermatt and went on to win five League titles and two Swiss Cups between 1968 and 1979. During his entire period in Basel, Fischli was never a fully professional soccer player; he worked for a sports firm.

In the summer of 1979 he joined FC Münchenstein in the third amateur league as player-manager. At the end of the season FC Münchenstein were promoted to the 2. Liga. In the two years under Fischli the team had a club record unbeaten run of 45 games.

Fischli joined FC Aarau in 1981 and retired as player in 1982, aged 37. He remained at the club as first team manager for a short while.

Honours
Basel
 Swiss League: 1969, 1970, 1972, 1973, 1977
 Swiss Cup: 1975
 Swiss League Cup: 1973

Aarau
 Swiss League Cup: 1982

References

External links
 

1945 births
Living people
Swiss men's footballers
Swiss football managers
FC Basel players
FC Aarau players
FC Aarau managers
SC Young Fellows Juventus players
Association football defenders
People from Glarus